A penumbral lunar eclipse took place on Monday, April 22, 1940. This was a deep penumbral eclipse, with the moon southern limb passing close to the northern umbral shadow.

Visibility

Related lunar eclipses

Saros series
It was part of Saros series 140.

Half-Saros cycle
A lunar eclipse will be preceded and followed by solar eclipses by 9 years and 5.5 days (a half saros). This lunar eclipse is related to two partial solar eclipses of Solar Saros 147.

Tritos series
 Preceded: Lunar eclipse of May 23, 1929
 Followed: Lunar eclipse of March 23, 1951

Tzolkinex
 Preceded: Lunar eclipse of August 4, 1933
 Followed: Lunar eclipse of June 3, 1947

See also
List of lunar eclipses
List of 20th-century lunar eclipses

Notes

External links

1940-04
1940 in science